Hutton Henry is a village in County Durham, in England near Peterlee, Castle Eden and Wingate. The population of the parish at the 2011 census was 1,565. It is situated to the west of Hartlepool, near the villages of Wingate and Station Town. At the top of hills in Hutton Henry the sea, Blackhall Colliery, Castle Eden, Wingate, Peterlee and Shotton can be seen.

In ca. 1050 the village was known as Hoton. Henry de Essh held it in the 14th century, providing the second part of the name. During the 19th century it was a mining village, as were the nearby villages of Wingate and Station Town. Its population increased from 156 in 1801 to 3,151 in 1891 due to the opening of collieries. Hutton Henry colliery was operational between 1876 and 1897 and was owned by Hutton Henry Coal Co. Ltd. In 1894 its average output was about 190,000 tons per annum, and it was said to employ 1,000 men and boys.

References

External links

Villages in County Durham
Civil parishes in County Durham